D. constricta  may refer to:
 Distorsio constricta, a sea snail species
 Dysgonia constricta, a moth species found in New Guinea, New South Wales and Queensland